Cupbop (stylized as CUP-BOP) is an American fast casual restaurant chain located in the United States and Indonesia. They serve street-food style Korean barbecue, otherwise known as cup-bap. 

Cupbop started out in 2013 as a food truck in Salt Lake County, Utah and has grown steadily. The restaurant is credited with bringing Korean BBQ to Utah. As of February 2023, in the United States there are 48 total store locations, six food trucks, and several concessions locations including the Utah Jazz NBA Arena. The chain also operates over 100 locations throughout Indonesia. In 2020 the chain saw $10 million in annual revenue.

History 

Junghun Song started Cupbop after finding out that Korean cuisine was not represented at a Utah food convention in 2013. Song and two of his friends began selling Korean cuisine out of a 20-year-old food truck soon after and became the founders and part-owners of Cupbop. 

Throughout 2015, Cupbop expanded by opening more food trucks and a brick and mortar restaurant near Brigham Young University. The company's recognizable branding led it to be frequently posted on social media and become known around the BYU campus. Cupbop ran local events and marketing campaigns to promote growth. Since its inception, Cupbop has opened over 30 stores across the U.S. and its sales have surpassed 25 million USD (30 billion won).

Cupbop saw acclaim in the restaurant industry with its inclusion Yahoo's selection of "27 of the Best Food Trucks in America" and was voted as the number one food truck in Utah in 2021. 

In May 2022, the company's owners appeared on the US television show Shark Tank and asked for $1 million in exchange for a 3% stake in the company. They made a deal with billionaire investor Mark Cuban, selling him 5 percent of the company for 1 million USD. As of 2022 they operate in six states–Utah, Idaho, Arizona, Colorado, Nevada, and Oklahoma.

Menu 
Cupbop's menu consists primarily of steamed rice bowls. They offer several different types of bowls, including chicken, beef, pork, vegetables and tofu, all served Korean barbecue style alongside rice and cabbage. Cupbop also serves other Korean staple foods such as mandu (a Korean dumpling) and kimchi.

References 

2013 establishments in Utah
Restaurants established in 2013
Restaurants in Utah
Fast-food chains of the United States
Fast-food franchises
Korean restaurants in the United States